Lui (for him) is a French adult entertainment magazine.

Lui may also refer to:

Lui (surname), various surnames (including a list of people with those surnames)
Lei (surname), a Chinese surname sometimes transliterated as Lui based on its Cantonese pronunciation
Lü (surname), a Chinese surname sometimes transliterated as Lui based on its Cantonese pronunciation
Lui, South Sudan
"Lui", 1980 French song by Michèle Torr
Lui language, a name applied to several putative languages
Lui Calibre, Youtuber and game commentator; see

Acronyms and abbreviations
 Civil Aviation Authority (Hungary), abbreviated 
 La Unión Airport (Honduras) (IATA: LUI)
 ISO 639:lui, the Uto-Aztecan Luiseño language of southern California